Cathedral High School was a Catholic co-educational college-preparatory high school in Springfield, Massachusetts. Originally opened in 1883 by the Sisters of Saint Joseph at the diocese's Saint Michael's Cathedral. In 2011 the school's building was destroyed by a tornado.

In 2015, it was announced that Cathedral High School would merge with Holyoke Catholic High School to form a new regional Catholic school that was completed in 2016 as Pope Francis High School. Pope Francis High School was then later renamed "Pope Francis Preparatory School." The school's current building is on the site of the original Cathedral High School.

History

Cathedral High School 
In 1883, the diocese's Bishop Patrick Thomas O'Reilly sought a teaching staff for a high school in response to the growing number of Catholic immigrants in the area.  Responding to the call, two members of the Sisters of St. Joseph from Flushing, New York came to Springfield to start up the school. In the years that followed Cathedral High School flourished in facilities on Elliot Street in downtown Springfield. By the 1940s the school had grown to nearly 1600 students. The school had outgrown its facilities, so the Diocese purchased a 30-acre (121,000 m2) farm on Surrey and Wendover Roads in Springfield and built a new school.  It opened on September 9, 1959. In the first decade at Surrey Road student enrollment grew to more than 2600 students.

In 2002 the school was re-accredited by New England Association of Schools and Colleges.

In an effort to consolidate the Diocese's educational resources in the wake of increasing financial difficulties, Cathedral High School was selected to host the newly established St. Michael's Academy, which hosted students from Grades 6 to 8. From 2008 to 2009, Cathedral was extensively remodeled to accommodate the new facility, which occupied a full wing of the main school facility.

On June 1, 2011, Cathedral High School was severely damaged in the tornado that struck Springfield, Massachusetts. The building was declared a total loss. The students had finished the remainder of the 2010–2011 school year at Elms College, located in Chicopee, Massachusetts. The school was based out of Memorial Elementary School in neighboring Wilbraham, Massachusetts from the 2011–2012 school year until 2016. Demolition of the original Cathedral High School building was completed in 2015.

Campus 
The school's Surrey Road campus was in Springfield's East Forest Park Neighborhood on a green and hilly plot of land which is now the site of Pope Francis Preparatory School

Original Building 
The school was divided into four main sections.  Most of the classrooms were in a building that, from the air, was shaped like a boxy eight with two courtyards in the open spaces formed by the eight.  A small chapel took up part of the first floor in one of the courtyards.  The school offices were near the main entrance, and the cafeteria extended towards the few athletic fields.

Extending north from the main building was the science wing.  Because of the hills the school was built in, the science wing's first and second floors were just above the main building's second and third floors.  The auditorium abutted the main building and was the largest high school auditorium in the area. On a lower grade than the rest of the school, were the gymnasium, a parking lot, and playing fields which included a full size football field that doubled as a soccer and lacrosse field.  Island Pond, on the eastern edge of the property, featured a rare floating island.

History 
Throughout its history, Cathedral High School had predominantly served the students of the City of Springfield.  However, many of its students had come from the suburbs of the city and some as far away as Sunderland, Palmer, and Connecticut. Being a Catholic school, a majority of its student had been Catholic.  However, that had never been a requirement for admission.  Before merging, the school enrollment had fallen to approximately 250 students. 70% of the students were from Springfield itself.

The school had 45 faculty members and administrators. Most of the faculty had a master's degree. Many had taught at the school for 20+ years.  For many years the faculty consisted of Sisters of St. Joseph and a small number of lay men and women. In later years members of religious communities remained a vital part of the school community, but in significantly smaller numbers. Nearly all the teachers were full-time.

Cathedral High School also sponsored teachers who were in the  Providence Alliance for Catholic Teachers, or PACT program, part of the University Consortium for Catholic Education. Through this program, young teachers are given the chance to earn a master's degree in education from Providence College, while devoting two years of service to the school where they are assigned. Before merging there was one teacher in the program at Cathedral and two graduates of the program taught at the school.

In 2004, the school welcomed its first lay principal.  With this, all Cathedral's academic leadership, including vice-principal, guidance director, business manager, librarians, and all department heads were lay people.

Cathedral High School was a college-preparatory program, where 96% of the graduates furthered their education. Members of the Class of 2009 attended Boston College, Boston University,  Fairfield University; Fordham University, College of the Holy Cross, Northeastern University, Bryant University, Providence College, Rochester Institute of Technology, St. Anselm's,  University of Connecticut, University of Massachusetts, University of Rochester, The Elms College, Villanova University, The Catholic University of America, and others.

Academics 
Cathedral High School offered College Prep, Advanced Placement, and Honors classes within the STREAM (Science, Technology, Religion, Engineering, Arts and Math) program.

History 
Cathedral High School had religion, science, English, fine arts & business, social studies, foreign language, physical education and mathematics departments.

Within their respective departments, Cathedral offered classes in scripture, world religions, earth science, biology, chemistry, physics, journalism, computer literacy, art (painting, drawing, and sculpture), United States History, World History, sociology, Spanish, French, Latin, algebra, geometry, calculus, and statistics.  Many of these classes and others were available as college prep or honors.  Advanced Placements were available in English, Calculus, Statistics, US History, Biology, Chemistry, Physics and Latin.

Extracurriculars

Sports 
The school's teams played sports as the Cathedral High School Panthers. The Panthers had sports teams at three competitive levels (varsity, JV and freshman).    
American football
Soccer
Cross Country Running
Golf
Field Hockey
Basketball
Ice hockey
Swimming
Indoor Track and Field
Lacrosse
Baseball
Softball
Outdoor Track and Field
Tennis

History 
Over the past 70 years Cathedral teams have won countless Western Massachusetts and state titles, including in football, soccer, cross country, basketball, hockey, indoor track and field, baseball, outdoor track and field and tennis.

Before the merger, the school's colors were purple and white. Cathedral's mascot was a Panther, and the squads were often referred to as the Purple Panthers. With the exception of Field Hockey and Football, all sports at Cathedral had both boys' and girls' teams.  Football, soccer, basketball, and baseball all had freshman, junior varsity, and varsity teams.  The others had JV and varsity teams. In the years prior to the merger, the school was perhaps best known for its Ice Hockey team. The Panthers had the only Division 1 hockey program in Western Massachusetts.

Cathedral High School hockey won their first state championship in 1996 when they beat Hingham High School 2–0 in a thrilling Division 2 Championship Game.

In 2009, the Cathedral High School ice hockey team won the Division 1 State Championship for the first time since 2003, beating Arlington Catholic, the Division 1 North Champions, for the title.

Clubs 
Clubs included National Honor Society, language clubs, choir, Outdoor Adventure club, and Model UN.

Notable alumni

Scott Barnes - Drafted by the Washington Nationals in the 43rd round of the 2005 MLB June Amateur Draft and the San Francisco Giants in the 8th round of the 2008 MLB June Amateur Draft.
Angelo Bertelli - 1943 Heisman Trophy winner at Notre Dame
Wayne Budd - Former Assistant US Attorney General
Nick Buoniconti - NFL Hall of Fame Linebacker
Chris Capuano - MLB pitcher
Bill Danoff - Singer & Songwriter, Member of Starland Vocal Band, Wrote John Denver's "Country Roads"
Vinny Del Negro - NBA Point Guard from 1988 to 2001 and former Head Coach of the Los Angeles Clippers
Paul Fenton - Former NHL player and current Assistant General Manager of the Nashville Predators
Mike Flynn - Baltimore Ravens offensive linemen
Nick Gorneault - Former MLB player (Los Angeles Angels)
Derek Kellogg - University of Massachusetts Men's Basketball Head Coach
John Leonard - Professional ice hockey player
Tim Mayotte - Tennis Professional
Larry O'Brien - Advisor to President Kennedy, Postmaster General and NBA commissioner
Thomas Reilly - Former Massachusetts Attorney General
Joe Scibelli - 15-year veteran in the NFL as a guard for the LA Rams
Tommy Tallarico - American video game music composer and musician.
Peter Welch - Democratic Congressman from Vermont
Bob Kudelski - 9-year veteran in the NHL.

References

External links

Congregation of the Sisters of Saint Joseph
Catholic secondary schools in Massachusetts
High schools in Springfield, Massachusetts
Educational institutions established in 1883
1883 establishments in Massachusetts
Educational institutions disestablished in 2016
2016 disestablishments in Massachusetts